The 2016 Red Bull Air Race of Ascot was the fifth round of the 2016 Red Bull Air Race World Championship season, the eleventh season of the Red Bull Air Race World Championship. The event was held at the Ascot Racecourse in Berkshire, United Kingdom.

Master Class

Qualification

Round of 14

 Pilot received 2 seconds in penalties.

Round of 8

 Pilot received 3 seconds in penalties.

Final 4

Challenger Class

Results

Standings after the event

Master Class standings

Challenger Class standings

 Note: Only the top five positions are included for both sets of standings.

References

External links

|- style="text-align:center"
|width="35%"|Previous race:2016 Red Bull Air Race of Budapest
|width="30%"|Red Bull Air Race2016 season
|width="35%"|Next race:2016 Red Bull Air Race of Lausitz
|- style="text-align:center"
|width="35%"|Previous race:2015 Red Bull Air Race of Ascot
|width="30%"|Red Bull Air Race of Ascot
|width="35%"|Next race:2017 Red Bull Air Race of Ascot
|- style="text-align:center"

Ascot
2016 in British motorsport
August 2016 sports events in Europe